Textual variants in the Gospel of Luke are the subject of the study called textual criticism of the New Testament. Textual variants in manuscripts arise when a copyist makes deliberate or inadvertent alterations to a text that is being reproduced. 
An abbreviated list of textual variants in this particular book is given in this article below.

Most of the variations are not significant and some common alterations include the deletion, rearrangement, repetition, or replacement of one or more words when the copyist's eye returns to a similar word in the wrong location of the original text. If their eye skips to an earlier word, they may create a repetition (error of dittography). If their eye skips to a later word, they may create an omission. They may resort to performing a rearranging of words to retain the overall meaning without compromising the context. In other instances, the copyist may add text from memory from a similar or parallel text in another location. Otherwise, they may also replace some text of the original with an alternative reading. Spellings occasionally change. Synonyms may be substituted. A pronoun may be changed into a proper noun (such as "he said" becoming "Jesus said"). John Mill's 1707 Greek New Testament was estimated to contain some 30,000 variants in its accompanying textual apparatus which was based on "nearly 100 [Greek] manuscripts." Peter J. Gurry puts the number of non-spelling variants among New Testament manuscripts around 500,000, though he acknowledges his estimate is higher than all previous ones.

Scholars find that many textual variants in the narratives of the Nativity of Jesus (Luke 2, as well as Matthew 1–2) and the Finding in the Temple (Luke 2:41–52) involve deliberate alterations such as substituting the words 'his father' with 'Joseph', or 'his parents' with 'Joseph and his mother'. Alexander Globe (1980) concluded 'that most of the non-Neutral readings under consideration were introduced to remove inconsistencies between the biblical narratives and abstract doctrinal statements concerning the virginity of Mary.'

Legend

Textual variants
{{show
|head-style = background-color: #F0F8FF; text-align: center;
|content-style = background-color: #FFFFFF; text-align: left;
|1 = 
|2 = 
<onlyinclude>

{{show
|head-style = background-color: #F0F8FF; text-align: center;
|content-style = background-color: #FFFFFF; text-align: left;
|1 =  
|2 = 
Luke 8:26
 Γερασηνων (Gerasenes) –  B D 0267 latt co
 Γεργεσηνων (Gergesenes) – א L X Θ Ξ f 22 33 157 579 700* 1241 1342 syr co arm geo Eusebius Epiphanius
 Γαδαρηνων (Gadarenes) – A R W Δ Ψ 0135 f 700 1071 Byz syr goth

Luke 8:43
 ιατροις προσαναλωσασα ολον τομ βιον (and had spent all her living upon physicians) – omitted by  B (D) 0279 syr co arm geo Origen. Generally omitted by Alexandrian text-type, but included by Byzantine text-type. Most scholars think that inclusions of this phrase in later manuscripts are probably a result of harmonisation attempts with Mark 5:26 rather than a Lukan rewriting of the Markan original, especially because προσαναλωσασα is a hapax legomenon.
 εἰς ἰατρούς προσαναλωσασα ολον τομ βιον (and had spent all her living to(wards) physicians) – Stephanus Textus Receptus 1550, Scrivener's Textus Receptus 1894

Luke 8:43
 ἀπ’ οὐδενὸς ap’ oudenos ((away) from / because of no one) – Alexandrian text-type.
 ὑπ’ οὐδενὸς hup’ oudenos (under(neath) / by / through no one) – Byzantine text-type.

Luke 8:45
 εἶπεν ὁ Πέτρος Ἐπιστάτα, οἱ ὄχλοι συνέχουσίν σε καὶ ἀποθλίβουσιν. (Peter said: 'Master, the people are crowding and pressing against you'.) – Alexandrian text-type.
 εἶπεν ὁ Πέτρος Ἐπιστάτα, οἱ ὄχλοι συνέχουσίν σε καὶ ἀποθλίβουσιν. (Peter and those beside him said: 'Master, the people are crowding and pressing against you'.) – Tischendorf 8th Edition
 εἴπεν ὁ Πέτρος καὶ οἱ μετ’ αὐτοῦ, Ἐπιστάτα, οἱ ὄχλοι συνέχουσίν σε καὶ ἀποθλίβουσιν, καὶ λέγεις, Tίς ὁ ἁψάμενός μου; (Peter and those with him said: 'Master, the people are crowding and pressing against you, and you say: "Who touched me?") – Byzantine text-type.

Luke 8:48
 Θυγάτηρ, ("Daughter,...") – Alexandrian text-type.
 Θάρσει, θύγατερ, ("Courage, daughter,...") – Byzantine text-type.

Luke 8:49
 μηκέτι σκύλλε τὸν διδάσκαλον ("... do not trouble the teacher anymore.") – Alexandrian text-type.
 μὴ σκύλλε τὸν διδάσκαλον ("... do not trouble the teacher.")  – Byzantine text-type.

Luke 8:51
 οὐκ ἀφῆκεν εἰσελθεῖν τινα σὺν αὐτῷ εἰ μὴ Πέτρον καὶ Ἰωάνην καὶ Ἰάκωβον (he did not allow anybody to enter with him if not Peter and John and James) – Alexandrian text-type.
 οὐκ ἀφῆκεν εἰσελθεῖν οὐδένα, εἰ μὴ Πέτρον καὶ Ἰάκωβον καὶ Ἰωάννην, (he did not allow nobody to enter if not Peter and James and John) – Byzantine text-type.

Luke 8:54
 αὐτὸς δὲ κρατήσας τῆς χειρὸς αὐτῆς (But he took her by the hand) – Alexandrian text-type.
 αὐτὸς δὲ ἐκβαλὼν ἔξω πάντας, καὶ κρατήσας τῆς χειρὸς αὐτῆς (But he put them all outside, and took her by the hand) – Byzantine text-type.
}}

{{show
|head-style = background-color: #F0F8FF; text-align: center;
|content-style = background-color: #FFFFFF; text-align: left;
|1 =  
|2 = 

Luke 23:6
 Πειλᾶτος δὲ ἀκούσας (when Pilate heard) – Alexandrian text-type: Westcott and Hort 1881, Westcott and Hort / [NA27 and UBS4 variants], 1864–94, Tischendorf 8th Edition, Nestle 1904
 Πιλάτος δὲ ἀκούσας Γαλιλαίαν (when Pilate heard of Galilee) – Byz: Stephanus Textus Receptus 1550, Scrivener's Textus Receptus 1894, RP Byzantine Majority Text 2005, Greek Orthodox Church

Luke 23:8
 διὰ τὸ ἀκούειν περὶ αὐτοῦ (because of hearing about him) – Alexandrian text-type: Westcott and Hort 1881, Westcott and Hort / [NA27 and UBS4 variants], 1864–94, Tischendorf 8th Edition, Nestle 1904
 διὰ τὸ ἀκούειν πολλὰ περὶ αὐτοῦ (because of hearing a lot about him) – Byz: Stephanus Textus Receptus 1550, Scrivener's Textus Receptus 1894, RP Byzantine Majority Text 2005, Greek Orthodox Church

Luke 23:17
 omitted – Alexandrian text-type: Westcott and Hort 1881, Westcott and Hort / [NA27 and UBS4 variants], 1864–94, Tischendorf 8th Edition, Nestle 1904
 ἀνάγκην δὲ εἶχεν ἀπολύειν αὐτοῖς κατὰ ἑορτὴν ἕνα. (for it was necessary for him to release one to them at the feast) – Byz: Stephanus Textus Receptus 1550, Scrivener's Textus Receptus 1894, RP Byzantine Majority Text 2005, Greek Orthodox Church

Luke 23:19
 βληθεὶς ἐν τῇ φυλακῇ (having been thrown into the prison) – Alexandrian text-type: Westcott and Hort 1881, Westcott and Hort / [NA27 and UBS4 variants], 1864–94, Tischendorf 8th Edition, Nestle 1904
 βεβλημένος εἰς φυλακὴν (had been thrown into prison) – Byz: Stephanus Textus Receptus 1550, Scrivener's Textus Receptus 1894, RP Byzantine Majority Text 2005
 βεβλημένος εἰς τὴν φυλακὴν (had been thrown into the prison) – Greek Orthodox Church

Luke 23:21
 Σταύρου, σταύρου αὐτόν (Crucify, crucify him! [imperative singular]) – Alexandrian text-type: Westcott and Hort 1881, Westcott and Hort / [NA27 and UBS4 variants], 1864–94, Tischendorf 8th Edition, Nestle 1904
 Σταύρωσον, σταύρωσον αὐτόν (Crucify, crucify him! [imperative plural]) – Byz: Stephanus Textus Receptus 1550, Scrivener's Textus Receptus 1894, RP Byzantine Majority Text 2005, Greek Orthodox Church

Luke 23:22
 οὐδὲν αἴτιον (no cause/reason/fault/guilt) – Alexandrian text-type: Westcott and Hort 1881, Westcott and Hort / [NA27 and UBS4 variants], 1864–94, Tischendorf 8th Edition, Nestle 1904. Byz: Stephanus Textus Receptus 1550, Scrivener's Textus Receptus 1894, RP Byzantine Majority Text 2005.
 οὐδὲν ἄξιον (not worthy/deserving/fit) – Greek Orthodox Church

Luke 23:23
 αἱ φωναὶ αὐτῶν (the voices of them) – Alexandrian text-type: Westcott and Hort 1881, Westcott and Hort / [NA27 and UBS4 variants], 1864–94, Tischendorf 8th Edition, Nestle 1904
 αἱ φωναὶ αὐτῶν καὶ τῶν ἀρχιερέων (the voices of them and of the chief priests) – Byz: Stephanus Textus Receptus 1550, Scrivener's Textus Receptus 1894, RP Byzantine Majority Text 2005, Greek Orthodox Church

Luke 23:25
 ἀπέλυσεν δὲ τὸν (then he released the [one]) – Alexandrian text-type: Westcott and Hort 1881, Westcott and Hort / [NA27 and UBS4 variants], 1864–94, Tischendorf 8th Edition, Nestle 1904
 ἀπέλυσε δὲ αὐτοῖς τὸν (then he released to them the [one]) – Byz: Stephanus Textus Receptus 1550, Scrivener's Textus Receptus 1894, RP Byzantine Majority Text 2005
 ἀπέλυσε δὲ αὐτοῖς τὸν Βαραββᾶν τὸν (then he released to them Barabbas, the [one]) – Greek Orthodox Church

Luke 23:35
 οἱ ἄρχοντες (the rulers) – Alexandrian text-type: Westcott and Hort 1881, Westcott and Hort / [NA27 and UBS4 variants], 1864–94, Tischendorf 8th Edition, Nestle 1904
 οἱ ἄρχοντες σὺν αὐτοῖς (the rulers with them) – Byz: Stephanus Textus Receptus 1550, Scrivener's Textus Receptus 1894, RP Byzantine Majority Text 2005, Greek Orthodox Church

Luke 23:38
 ἦν δὲ καὶ ἐπιγραφὴ ἐπ’ αὐτῷ· ὁ βασιλεὺς τῶν Ἰουδαίων οὗτος. (There was also an inscription above him: "The king of the Jews, this [is].") – Alexandrian text-type: Westcott and Hort 1881, Westcott and Hort / [NA27 and UBS4 variants], 1864–94, Tischendorf 8th Edition, Nestle 1904
 ἦν δὲ καὶ ἐπιγραφὴ γεγραμμένη ἐπ’ αὐτῷ γράμμασιν Ἑλληνικοῖς καὶ Ρωμαϊκοῖς καὶ Ἑβραϊκοῖς, Οὗτός ἐστιν ὁ βασιλεὺς τῶν Ἰουδαίων. (There was also an inscription written above him in Greek and Latin and Hebrew letters: "This is the king of the Jews.") – Byz: Stephanus Textus Receptus 1550, Scrivener's Textus Receptus 1894, RP Byzantine Majority Text 2005, Greek Orthodox Church

Luke 23:39
 Οὐχὶ σὺ εἶ ὁ Χριστός; σῶσον σεαυτὸν καὶ ἡμᾶς. (Are you not the Christ/Messiah? Save yourself and us!) – Alexandrian text-type: Westcott and Hort 1881, Westcott and Hort / [NA27 and UBS4 variants], 1864–94, Tischendorf 8th Edition, Nestle 1904
 Εἰ σὺ εἶ ὁ Χριστός, σῶσον σεαυτὸν καὶ ἡμᾶς. (If you are the Christ/Messiah, save yourself and us!) – Byz: Stephanus Textus Receptus 1550, Scrivener's Textus Receptus 1894, RP Byzantine Majority Text 2005, Greek Orthodox Church

Luke 23:42
 καὶ ἔλεγεν Ἰησοῦ, μνήσθητί μου (And he said: "Jesus, remember me..." or And he said to Jesus: "Remember me...") – Alexandrian text-type: Westcott and Hort 1881, Westcott and Hort / [NA27 and UBS4 variants], 1864–94, Nestle 1904
 καὶ ἔλεγεν· Ἰησοῦ, μνήσθητί μου (And he said: "Jesus, remember me..."''') – Tischendorf 8th Edition
 Καὶ ἔλεγεν τῷ Ἰησοῦ,/· Μνήσθητί μου, κύριε/Κύριε, (And he said to Jesus: "Remember me, Lord/lord,...") – Byz: Stephanus Textus Receptus 1550, Scrivener's Textus Receptus 1894, RP Byzantine Majority Text 2005, Greek Orthodox Church

Luke 23:45
 τοῦ ἡλίου ἐκλιπόντος (the sun ended/failed/ceased/left out) – Alexandrian text-type: Westcott and Hort 1881, Westcott and Hort / [NA27 and UBS4 variants], 1864–94, Nestle 1904. Greek Orthodox Church (Luke 23:44).
 καὶ ἐσκοτίσθη ὁ ἥλιος (and the sun darkened) – Byz: Stephanus Textus Receptus 1550, Scrivener's Textus Receptus 1894, RP Byzantine Majority Text 2005

}}

</onlyinclude>
}}

 See also 
 Alexandrian text-type
 Biblical inerrancy
 Byzantine text-type
 Caesarean text-type
 Categories of New Testament manuscripts
 Comparison of codices Sinaiticus and Vaticanus
 List of New Testament verses not included in modern English translations
 Textual variants in the New Testament
 Textual variants in the Gospel of Matthew
 Textual variants in the Gospel of Mark
 Textual variants in the Gospel of John
 Western text-type

References

 Further reading 

 Novum Testamentum Graece et Latine, ed. E. Nestle, K. Aland, Stuttgart 1981.
 Bruce M. Metzger & Bart D. Ehrman, "The Text of the New Testament: Its Transmission, Corruption, and Restoration", OUP New York, Oxford, 4 edition, 2005
 Bart D. Ehrman, "The Orthodox Corruption of Scripture. The Effect of Early Christological Controversies on the Text of the New Testament", Oxford University Press, New York - Oxford, 1996, pp. 223–227.
 Bruce M. Metzger, "A Textual Commentary on the Greek New Testament: A Companion Volume to the United Bible Societies' Greek New Testament", 1994, United Bible Societies'', London & New York.

External links 
 The Comparative Critical Greek New Testament
 Variantes textuais 
 Varianten Textus receptus versus Nestle-Aland
 The Gospel of Luke part of the Holy Bible

Greek New Testament manuscripts
Biblical criticism
Textual criticism
Gospel of Luke